Bengston is a surname. Notable people with the surname include:

Billy Al Bengston (born 1934), American artist and sculptor
Nelson Bengston (1905–1986), American businessman